The Message is an album by saxophonist Illinois Jacquet with guitarist Kenny Burrell recorded in 1963 and released on the Argo label.

Reception

Allmusic awarded the album 3 stars stating "This rather brief LP (just 31 minutes) finds tenorman Illinois Jacquet in typically fine form, but fronting a rather anonymous-sounding group (despite the presence of guitarist Kenny Burrell on some numbers)".

Track listing 
All compositions by Illinois Jacquet except where noted
 "The Message" (Ben Tucker) - 3:45   
 "Wild Man" – 5:00   
 "Bassoon Blues" (Esmond Edwards, Illinois Jacquet) - 3:50   
 "On Broadway" (Barry Mann, Cynthia Weil, Jerry Leiber, Mike Stoller) - 4:00   
 "Like Young" (André Previn) - 4:00   
 "Turnpike" - 5:45   
 "Bonita" (Edwards) - 5:40

Personnel 
Illinois Jacquet - tenor saxophone, bassoon
Kenny Burrell, Wallace Richardson - guitar
Ralph Smith - organ
Ben Tucker - bass
Ray Lucas - drums
Willie Rodriguez - percussion

References 

1963 albums
Argo Records albums
Illinois Jacquet albums
Albums produced by Esmond Edwards